Guðbjörg Edda Björgvinsdóttir (born 13 September 1952), better known as Edda Björgvinsdóttir, is an Icelandic actress, comedian, writer, director and motivational speaker. She is best known for playing the titular role of the 1986 comedy classic Stella í orlofi, for playing various characters in the 1986 sitcom Heilsubælið í Gervahverfi, as well as for her work in the annual comedy special Áramótaskaupið, and for numerous other comedic roles in film, television and on stage.

Early years and education 
Edda was born in Reykjavík, Iceland in 1952. When she was about two years old her family moved to the countryside, where her father was the headmaster of a boarding school for troubled boys. She graduated from Menntaskólinn við Hamrahlíð in 1972. She studied Philosophy at the University of Iceland in 1973 and Roentgen Technology at the Polytechnic School of Reykjavík in 1974. She then studied drama for one year at the United Drama School (Leiklistarskóli Leikhúsanna) from 1974-1975 and furthered her studies at the Icelandic State Drama School and The Icelandic Academy of Arts in Reykjavík from which she graduated with distinction in 1978 with Bachelor of Arts degree in Performing Arts. In 2013 Edda graduated with master's degree in cultural management from Bifröst University.

Career 
Shortly after graduation Edda made her debut at the National Theatre of Iceland in Reykjavík in Jökull Jakobssons's drama "The Shoemakers Son the Bakers Daughter" praised by critics and audiences alike as one of the most individual and versatile actresses of her generation. She soon turned out to be equally suited to broad comedy and serious drama, a talent which has furnished her with a career of deserved diversity as one of the most sought after talents in the business.

During her rather short spell as a star player in serious dramas at the beginning of her career on stage and television, as well as being a featured leading lady in several epic motion pictures, she addressed audiences during evening performances in the theatre with a variety of classical and contemporary parts, throwing in matinées of family and children's shows, switching into her comedy gear after almost every evening performance, rushing to the nearest comedy club with her stand up routine. The demand for her services as a comedienne increased considerably during the first two years of her career, eventually turning her into a full-time leading force on the comedy circuit in Iceland.

Personal life 
Edda was married to actor and comedian Gísli Rúnar Jónsson. They met in Drama school and got divorced in 2000. Although being divorced they were still best of friends until his death. They had two sons actors Björgvin Franz Gíslason and Róbert Ólíver Gíslason. Edda has two daughters from previous relationships named Eva Dögg and Margrét Ýrr. In 2018, she was awarded the Knight's Cross of the Order of the Falcon.

Selected filmography 
 When the Raven Flies (1984)
 Heilsubælið í Gervahverfi (1986)
 Stella í orlofi (1986)
 Karlakórinn Hekla (1992)
 The Sacred Mound (1993)
 Dramarama (2001)
 Stella í framboði (2002)
 Under the Tree (2017)

References

External links 
 
 Official English website
 Official Icelandic website
                       

1952 births
Living people
Edda Bjorgvinsdottir
Edda Bjorgvinsdottir
Edda Bjorgvinsdottir
Edda Bjorgvinsdottir
Edda Bjorgvinsdottir
Edda Bjorgvinsdottir
Edda Bjorgvinsdottir
Edda Bjorgvinsdottir
Knights of the Order of the Falcon
Edda Bjorgvinsdottir